The following is a list of programs broadcast on Fox Filipino.

Final programming

Drama

Local
Ika-6 na Utos

Film and special presentations
Super Sine

Informative
 Born to Be Wild 
 Planet Philippines

Original programming
Native Tongue

Previous programming

Drama

Adarna 
Adik Sa'Yo 
Ako si Kim Samsoon 
Alakdana 
All About Eve 
All My Life 
Alyas Robin Hood 
Amaya 
Ang Babaeng Hinugot sa Aking Tadyang 
Ang Dalawang Mrs. Real 
Asian Treasures 
Aso ni San Roque 
Babaeng Hampaslupa 
Babangon Ako't Dudurugin Kita 
Bakekang 
Bantatay 
Beauty Queen 
Because of You 
Buena Familia 
Captain Barbell 
Carmela 
Cielo de Angelina 
Codename: Asero 
Darna 
Destiny Rose 
Dwarfina 
Dyesebel 
Encantadia (2005) 
Encantadia (2016) 
Enchanted Garden 
Endless Love 
Futbolilits 
Gagambino 
Genesis 
Glamorosa 
Grazilda 
Habang Kapiling Ka 
The Half Sisters 
Hiram na Alaala 
Iglot 
Ikaw Sana 
Ilumina 
Ilustrado 
Impostora 
Ina, Kasusuklaman Ba Kita? 
Indio 
Ismol Family 
JejeMom 
Joaquin Bordado 
Kamandag 
Kambal Sirena 
Katipunan 
Kaya Kong Abutin ang Langit 
Koreana 
La Vendetta 
The Last Prince 
Legacy 
Let the Love Begin 
Little Nanay 
Little Star 
Love & Lies 
Luna Blanca 
Luna Mystika 
Machete 
Magdusa Ka 
Magic Palayok 
Magkano Ba ang Pag-ibig?  
Majika 
Makapiling Kang Muli 
MariMar 
Mga Mata ni Anghelita 
Mulawin 
Mulawin vs. Ravena 
Muli 
Mundo Mo'y Akin 
Munting Heredera 
My Beloved 
My Destiny 
My Husband's Lover 
Nandito Ako 
Niño 
Paano Ba ang Mangarap? 
Pahiram ng Sandali 
Panday Kids 
Pati Ba Pintig ng Puso 
Pilyang Kerubin 
Poor Señorita 
Rhodora X 
Rosalinda 
Rod Santiago's The Sisters 
Sa Ngalan ng Ina 
Someone to Watch Over Me 
Spooky Nights 
Stairway to Heaven 
Sugo 
Super Twins 
Strawberry Lane 
That's My Amboy 
Temptation of Wife  
Trudis Liit 
Wagas 
Wish I May 
Yagit

Anthology
Case Solved 
Karelasyon

Comedy
Bubble Gang 
Kaya ng Powers 
Pepito Manaloto

Foreign
Alpha Dogs 
La Teniente
The Fierce Wife
Learn Out Loud  
It Started with a Kiss 
OK-JEK   
Snake Wranglers 
The Walking Dead

Informative
 Camera Trap: Wild Scene Investigation

Public affairs
100% Pinoy 
Balikbayan 
Biyahe ni Drew 
Pinoy Abroad 
Pinoy Meets World 
Wish Ko Lang

Notes

Jeepney TV
Jeepney TV